First Christian Church (Immanuel Baptist Church) is a historic church building at 850 S. 4th Street in Louisville, Kentucky.

The Beaux Arts building was designed by McDonald & Dodd and built in 1910.  It was added to the National Register of Historic Places in 1979.

In 2015, the building was purchased by Immanuel Baptist Church, a Southern Baptist church, and a complete renovation project was begun in May 2016.

References

External links
Immanuel Baptist Church

Baptist churches in Kentucky
Churches on the National Register of Historic Places in Kentucky
Beaux-Arts architecture in Kentucky
Churches completed in 1910
20th-century Baptist churches in the United States
Churches in Louisville, Kentucky
National Register of Historic Places in Louisville, Kentucky
Southern Baptist Convention churches